The StumpJump 50k is an ultramarathon in the Southeastern United States that features a grueling course of extreme elevation changes and technical trail sections. The annual event takes place the first Saturday in October on the Signal Mountain, Tennessee, portion of the Cumberland Trail. In 2007 the race field was limited to 400 participants to limit the impact on this wilderness area. The race benefits the Cumberland Trail Conference, and in 2007, raised $4,000 for CTC's for trail-building and maintenance programs.

Course
The course is shaped like a lollipop, with a total elevation gain of several thousand feet. Runners leave the stick of the lollipop at mile 10.3, then run a 10.2 mile loop and rejoin the stick at mile 20.5. This means that runners see the first 10 or so miles twice, which contains the most elevation change in the whole race. Runners cross Suck Creek Road twice.

The 50k course’s first and last 4 miles are on a jeep/dirt road. For the middle portion of the race, the trail is predominantly technical single track made up of packed dirt and mountain stone, including one section runners have nicknamed the "Rock Garden".

History and records
The Rock/Creek StumpJump 50k was started in 2002 by local trail running enthusiast Matt Sims as a way to get support for the Cumberland Trail Conference and promote local participation in trail running. Today, the race receives some of trail running’s top athletes including Max King, Duncan Callahan, John Stamstad, Josh Beckham, Peter Kazery, Bryan Dayton and David Riddle, who holds the course record of 3 hours 49 min. and 52 seconds, set in 2011. Kris Whorton holds the women’s record with a time of 4:50:39. The race was founded with the support of Rock/Creek, a local retailer. Today the race is a part of the larger Salomon Rock/Creek Trail Series.

External links
StumpJump official site 
Bad Beard Trail Series official site
Cumberland Trail Conference - river gorge segment
First-timer's report from 2003 event
PRWeb release: $3,000 raised for CTC in 2006
Rock/Creek StumpJump 50K flickr group

Ultramarathons in the United States
Sports competitions in Tennessee
Hamilton County, Tennessee
Sports in Tennessee
2002 establishments in Tennessee
Recurring sporting events established in 2002